Temple Christian School is a private Christian school in Fort Worth, Texas, founded in 1972. It serves students from pre-K to 12th grade at its 29-acre campus on 6824 Randol Mill Road in northeast Fort Worth.  Temple is a coeducational institution serving students with college prep and general programs.

References

External links
 Official Website

Christian schools in Texas
Private K-12 schools in Texas
Educational institutions established in 1972
1972 establishments in Texas